War of the Worlds: Global Dispatches is a 1996  science fiction anthology, edited by Kevin J. Anderson and published by American company Bantam Spectra. It is a tribute to H. G. Wells' 1898 novel The War of the Worlds; each story envisions a famous individual's reactions to the Martian invasion and the impact of the invasion on a different part of the world.

Several of the stories tie into other works of fiction; Anderson would also later go on to write The Martian War, a novel that also presented Wells' Martian invasion from the viewpoints of Wells and several other fictional and historical characters.

Global Dispatches was one of the works consulted by Stephen Baxter for his own sequel to The War of the Worlds, The Massacre of Mankind.

Table of contents

References

External links
Article in Steven Silver's Reviews

1996 books
Alternate history anthologies
Science fiction anthologies
Global Dispatches
Works edited by Kevin J. Anderson
Sequel novels
Cultural depictions of Albert Einstein
Cultural depictions of Mahatma Gandhi
Cultural depictions of Theodore Roosevelt
Cultural depictions of Joseph Stalin
Cultural depictions of Leo Tolstoy
Cultural depictions of Mark Twain
Cultural depictions of Jules Verne
Bantam Spectra books